Statte is a town and comune in the province of Taranto, part of the Apulia region of southeast Italy. Until 1 May 1993 the town was part of the territory of the comune of Taranto.

References

Municipalities of the Province of Taranto